The Governor of Novgorod Oblast is the head of government of Novgorod Oblast, a federal subject of Russia.

The position was introduced in 1991 as Head of Administration of Novgorod Oblast. The Governor is elected by direct popular vote for a term of five years.

List of officeholders

References 

Politics of Novgorod Oblast
 
Novgorod